Morris S. Novik (1903–1996), an early pioneer in radio, is credited with being one of the first people to understand the potential that radio had for public service and education, especially with regard to the emerging labor movement throughout the U.S. in the early part of the 20th century.

Biography
Born in Nevel, Russia, Novik emigrated to New York City’s lower East Side with his family, and, as a teenager, became active in socialist politics. In 1918, he worked for anti-war activist Scott Nearing, who was opposing the Republican Fiorello La Guardia for Congress. In a 1989 The New Yorker interview, Novik said that this was when he first saw the future mayor, for whom he would work 20 years later as station manager of WNYC.

During the 1920s, Novik chaired the local chapter of the Young People’s Socialist League, and worked to bring socialist education to public schools. He also worked for The Daily Record, a labor oriented newspaper focused on the clothing industry. Still advocating for a socialist, labor oriented agenda, he joined the staff of the International Ladies' Garment Workers’ Union as the director of the Unity House, the union’s summer resort that provided culture and education for its members. There, he created the Discussion Guild, arranging lectures and debates among some of the most notable thinkers of the day, including Clarence Darrow, Bertrand Russell, Will Durant, John Dewey and many others.  

But even though these events were often held in large venues such as Carnegie Hall, Novik understood that they were limited in their exposure, and that the new medium of radio could bring the latest thinking on the labor movement to households throughout the country. In 1932, Novik joined the staff of the relatively new radio station WEVD, named for the most notable socialist of the day, Eugene V. Debs, who had died five years earlier.  As associate manager and program director, he founded the University of the Air, featuring broadcast lectures, discussions and debates focusing primarily on a socialist thinking and organized labor.   

In 1938, Mayor Fiorello La Guardia recruited Novik to head up WNYC, the municipal broadcasting station in New York City. There, he is said to have coined the term ‘public broadcasting.’ He not only continued using radio for public education and discussion, but was also responsible for broadcasting more live music than any other radio station in the country, including, among many other ground-breaking programs, The American Music Festival. During the war, Novik also assisted La Guardia in the creation of weekly underground broadcasts to the people in Italy.   Novik served as director of WNYC until the end of La Guardia’s final term, on December 31, 1945.  

During the 1940s Novik helped found the National Association of Educational Broadcasters (NAEB), and served as its first executive secretary from 1941-1948. In the 1950s, he received the National Award and Citation of Merit from the NAEB. 

In 1950, Novik bought WLIB, located in the center of Harlem in New York, and developed programming geared especially to the black population in the city. He kept the station until 1955, when he sold it to his brother, Harry Novik, who maintained that mission until 1971, when he sold the station, and it became the first Black-owned station in New York City. 

After World War II, President Truman appointed Novik to an advisory commission assisting European countries in their efforts to establish new communications media. In 1962, he was appointed by President Kennedy to the U.S. Advisory Committee on Information, and was re-appointed later by President Johnson.  Novik also maintained his close ties to the Labor movement, serving as communications consultant to the American Federation of Labor and later to the AFL-CIO. 

In 1956, together with his wife, he survived the sinking of the Italian Liner Andrea Doria. One of the last passengers to leave the sinking ship, he assisted the crew in the evacuation efforts, and was later honored by the Italian government.

In the 1960s and for the rest of his career, Novik advocated for more public service broadcasting by radio stations. Testifying frequently before Congress, and in many speeches and articles, he urged lawmakers and the FCC to adhere to the standards set by the Communications Act of 1934, setting forth the public service function of radio, and lamented the brief coverage that most radio and TV stations were providing on the vital issues of the day.

Morris S. Novik died in New York City in 1996.

References

General references
Novik and LaGuardia, in Talk of the Town, The New Yorker, August 28, 1989, pp. 24-26.

Labor Turns to Radio, by Morris S. Novik, Broadcasting-Telecasting, September 19, 1955. 

M.S. Novik: Radio’s Conscience by Richard J. Mayer. NAEB Journal, March-April 1966, pp 8–13

Broadcasting:Vital for the Great Society, by Morris S. Novik, Speech before the 35th Institute for Education by Radio-Television, Columbus, Ohio, June 2-3, 1965.

WNYC Website: 

1903 births
1996 deaths
Radio pioneers
International Ladies Garment Workers Union leaders
Emigrants from the Russian Empire to the United States